George Sayles (26 March 1899 – June 1971) was an English professional footballer who played as a full back in the Football League for Reading, in non-League football for York City was on the books of Cardiff City without making a league appearance.

He also played minor counties cricket for Berkshire from 1928 to 1949, making a total of 76 appearances in the Minor Counties Championship.

References

1899 births
Cricketers from Sheffield
1971 deaths
English footballers
Association football fullbacks
Cardiff City F.C. players
Reading F.C. players
York City F.C. players
English Football League players
Midland Football League players
English cricketers
Berkshire cricketers